The Lent Bumps 1999 were a series of rowing races held at Cambridge University from Tuesday 23 February 1999 until Saturday 27 February 1999. The event was run as a bumps race and is one of a series of Lent Bumps which have been held annually in late-February or early March since 1887. See Lent Bumps for the format of the races. In 1999, a total of 121 crews took part (69 men's crews and 52 women's crews), with around 1000 participants in total. Several thousand spectators came to watch, particularly on the Saturday.

Head of the River crews 
 Caius men bumped Downing, Lady Margaret and First and Third Trinity to take their first ever headship of the Lent Bumps.

 Trinity Hall women bumped Emmanuel to take their 2nd headship since 1996.

Highest 2nd VIIIs 
 The highest men's 2nd VIII for the 3rd consecutive year was Lady Margaret II.

 The highest women's 2nd VIII was Jesus II, who bumped Lady Margaret II on the 3rd day.

Links to races in other years

Bumps Charts 
Below are the bumps charts for the 1st and 2nd divisions, with the men's event on the left and women's event on the right. The bumps chart represents the progress of every crew over all four days of the racing. To follow the progress of any particular crew, simply find the crew's name on the left side of the chart and follow the line to the end-of-the-week finishing position on the right of the chart.

Lent Bumps results
1999 in English sport
1999 in rowing
February 1999 sports events in the United Kingdom